Immobile is the second single by Italian pop singer Alessandra Amoroso. The song's public debut was in 2008 on the television talent show Amici di Maria De Filippi and appeared on the show's compilation album Scialla in January 2009. Later that year it was also released on Amoroso's debut EP Stupida.

Immobile is one of the most commercially successful songs from the Amici television show. It reached number one in the national singles charts and was certified platinum by the Federation of the Italian Music Industry for selling over 30,000 units.

Track listing
Digital download

Charts

Year-end charts

References

External links
Immobile Live @ Amici

Alessandra Amoroso songs
2009 singles
Pop ballads
Italian-language songs
Number-one singles in Italy